The 2000–01 Missouri Tigers men's basketball team represented the University of Missouri as a member of the Big 12 Conference during the 2000–01 NCAA men's basketball season. Led by second-year head coach Quin Snyder, the Tigers reached the second round of the NCAA tournament, and finished with an overall record of 20–13 (9–7 Big 12).

Roster

Schedule and results

 
|-
!colspan=9 style=| Regular season

|-
!colspan=9 style=| Big 12 Conference tournament

|-
!colspan=9 style=| NCAA tournament

Rankings

References

Missouri
Missouri
Missouri Tigers men's basketball seasons